The Men's team time trial of the 2015 UCI Road World Championships was a cycling event that took place on September 20, 2015, in Richmond, Virginia, United States. It was the 31st edition of the championship, and the 4th since its reintroduction in 2012. American team  were the defending champions, having won in 2014.

Course

The course rolled off from Henrico County at Lewis Ginter Botanical Garden, originally the Lakeside Wheel Club, founded in 1895 as a gathering spot for turn-of-the-century cyclists. The opening kilometers raced through Richmond's historic Northside neighborhoods leading into downtown. The course continued east of Richmond down rural Route 5, which parallels the 50-mile Virginia Capital Trail. The first few kilometers were scenic, flat, open roads that eventually narrowed and went through Richmond National Battlefield Park, a historic Civil War site. The race re-entered the city through Shockoe Bottom, eventually making a hard right turn on Governor Street to ascend . At the top, the teams had to take a sharp left turn onto the false-flat finishing straight,  to the finish.

Qualification

It was an obligation for all 2015 UCI ProTeams to participate. As well as this, invitations were sent to the 20 leading teams of the 2015 UCI Europe Tour, the top 5 leading teams of the 2015 UCI America Tour and 2015 UCI Asia Tour and the leading teams of the 2015 UCI Africa Tour and 2015 UCI Oceania Tour on August 15, 2015. Teams that accepted the invitation within the deadline had the right to participate. Every participating team were allowed to register nine riders from its team roster, with the exception of stagiaires, and had to select six riders to compete in the event.

Schedule
All times are in Eastern Daylight Time (UTC−4).

Final classification

BMC Racing won the event, beating Etixx–Quick-Step by more than 11 seconds. Tinkoff–Saxo finished last, more than 8 minutes behind the race winners, after Michael Valgren and Michael Rogers touched wheels and crashed.

References

Men's team time trial
Men's team time trial
UCI Road World Championships – Men's team time trial
2015 in men's road cycling